Disney XD was a Latin American pay television channel owned by The Walt Disney Company and one of the channels of Disney Branded Television which operated across Mexico, Central America, South America and the Caribbean region.

It was directly operated by Disney Media Networks and The Walt Disney Company Latin America. Launched on November 8, 1996, as an international feed of Fox Kids, it was rebranded as Disney XD in 2009 after five years under Disney's interim Jetix branding. The network closed on March 31, 2022, with its content shifting to Disney Channel and Disney+.

History

As Fox Kids (1996–2004) 

The channel was launched on November 8, 1996, as Fox Kids, originally owned by Fox Kids Worldwide Inc., a joint venture of Saban Entertainment and News Corporation. It was the third international version of the network to launch after those in Australia and the United Kingdom and Ireland, and the first version in another language besides English. On July 24, 2001, FKW was sold to The Walt Disney Company for US$5.3 billion.

As Jetix (2004–2009) 

On August 1, 2004, the TV network transitioned to Disney's new international children's action brand, Jetix, with Disney content merged into the schedule throughout the two years before. It was the first Fox Kids network to rebrand as Jetix.

As Disney XD (2009–2022) 
In May 2009, after Toon Disney was rebranded to Disney XD in the United States, the Latin American-Disney branch confirmed Disney XD would replace Jetix in Latin America on July 3, 2009. On January 18, 2010, a Pacific feed was introduced for all South American Pacific countries and Bolivia outside Colombia. In August 2016, the channel moved to a full-time widescreen presentation, launching high-definition operations in each territory when technically able to. The Pacific South American feed shifted to a -1 hour feed of the eastern feed in June 2017.

Feeds 
Disney XD Latin America was split into three feeds across the region. The network's three feeds were timed to UTC–6 (identified within network promotions as Mexico City) and UTC−05:00 (identified as Bogotá or "Sureste") in Spanish, and in Brazilian Portuguese, defaulted to UTC−03:00 (identified as Rio de Janeiro or Sao Paulo).

Programming

References 

Television channels and stations established in 1996
Spanish-language television stations
Latin America
Defunct television channels
Children's television networks
1996 establishments in South America
Television channel articles with incorrect naming style
The Walt Disney Company Latin America
Television channels and stations disestablished in 2022
2022 disestablishments in South America